"Floating" is a song by the Moody Blues from their November 1969 album To Our Children's Children's Children, a concept album about space travel, dedicated to NASA and the Apollo 11 astronauts.

Background
Written by band flautist Ray Thomas, "Floating" is a jaunty, semi-children's song about a future in which advances in space travel have enabled the Moon to become a family vacation spot.  The song's lyrics describe the experience of "Floating" from weightlessness due to the microgravity experienced in space flight.

Thomas's previous outspoken sympathy for LSD advocate Timothy Leary, as expressed in his song "Legend of a Mind", along with coincidental drug-related slang terms current at the time involving words such as "candy" and "rock," led some Americans to see in "Floating" a coded encouragement to use drugs.

Personnel
 Ray Thomas – lead vocals
 Justin Hayward – acoustic guitar, backing vocals
 John Lodge – bass guitar, backing vocals
 Mike Pinder – Mellotron, Celesta, backing vocals
 Graeme Edge – drums, percussion

References

The Moody Blues songs
Songs about spaceflight
1969 songs
Songs written by Ray Thomas